Louis Ducis (14 July 1775, Versailles - 2 March 1847, Paris) was a French painter and student of Jacques-Louis David.

Biography
Louis Ducis was instructed by David, whom he partly imitated in his historical pieces, besides which he devoted himself also to genre and portrait painting. His 'Mary Stuart' and 'The Début of Talma' were formerly in the Luxembourg Gallery. He died in 1847.

References
 
 Joan Mut i Arbós, "Sappho Recalled to Life by Music: Feminine Emotion and raison d'état in Neoclassical Napoleonic Painting", Music in Art: International Journal for Music Iconography XLIII/1-2 (2018), 21–48.

1775 births
1847 deaths
18th-century French painters
French male painters
19th-century French painters
Pupils of Jacques-Louis David
Artists from Versailles
18th-century French male artists